Gouldtown is a hamlet in the Canadian province of Saskatchewan located in Morse No. 165.  It is located 12 miles north of Herbert. Gouldtown is home to approximately 10 people. Its amenities include a post office and well.

See also
 List of communities in Saskatchewan
 Hamlets of Saskatchewan

Morse No. 165, Saskatchewan